Percy Ikerd (May 4, 1890 – March 10, 1955) was an American production manager and an assistant director who was nominated during the 6th Academy Awards for the short lived Best Assistant Director category He was the production manager for several films including High Noon and Oklahoma!, which Oklahoma was released after his death.

Selected filmography
Oklahoma! (1955) (Production manager, Uncredited, released after his death.)
A Bullet Is Waiting (1954) (production supervisor)
Column South (1953) (Unit production manager, uncredited)
The Moonlighter (1953) (production manager - Credited as Perc Ikerd)
High Noon (1952) (Unit manager)
Japanese War Bride (1952) (production manager) 
The Raiders (1952) (unit production manager - uncredited)
Tap Roots (1948) (production manager) 
Jitterbugs (1943) (assistant director-uncredited)
Margin for Error (1943) (assistant director)
Trade Winds (1938) (assistant director) 
The Hurricane (location unit manager - uncredited)
One Rainy Afternoon (1936) (assistant director) 
Strike Me Pink (1936) (assistant director - uncredited) 
George White's 1935 Scandals (1935) (unit manager-uncredited)
In Old Kentucky (1935) (business manager - uncredited) 
Call It Luck (1934) (assistant director - uncredited) 
George White's Scandals (1934) (assistant director) 
Such Women Are Dangerous (1934) (assistant director - uncredited)
The Last Trail (1933) (assistant director-uncredited)
Pleasure Cruise (1931) (second unit director-uncredited)

References

External links
 

1890 births
1955 deaths
People from Shelby County, Tennessee
Film directors from Tennessee
Assistant directors